Elachista glenni is a moth of the family Elachistidae. It is found in the United States, where it has been recorded from Illinois and Florida.

References

glenni
Moths described in 1996
Moths of North America